Everett "Happy" Robbins was a Chicago-based pianist, bandleader and composer.

Born in Muskogee, Oklahoma, he moved to Chicago in 1916 and studied at the American Conservatory of Music. Lineups of his bands in the 1920s, such as Everett and his Syncopated Robins, included Eddie Vincent, Benney Fields, Jimmy Dudley, William Hoy, and Henry Johnson, while Everett Robbins' Jazz Screamers included Bob Shoffner.

As well as leading his own bands, he also recorded, as a pianist, in 1922, with Mamie Smith's Jazz Hounds, coinciding with Garvin Bushell, Coleman Hawkins, Bubber Miley and Herb Flemming.

Robbins made piano rolls for the Capitol Roll & Record Company and is possibly most known for "Ain't Nobody's Business", a song he co-wrote with Porter Grainger in 1922. Both pianists played in Mamie Smith's Jazz Hounds around the same time, but as they played the same instrument, they are unlikely to have coincided.

Discography

As leader/co-leader
1923: "Hard Luck Blues"
1991: Boogie Woogie Blues
2001: Jazz & Blues Piano, Vol. 2: 1924-1947

As sideman
1922: with Mamie Smith's Jazz Hounds

References

External links 
 They called him 'Happy' Everett Robbins, article by Len Kunstadt in Record Research issue #61 (July 1964).

American jazz bandleaders